Hala is a 2019 American drama film written and directed by Minhal Baig. The film was screened in the U.S. Dramatic Competition section at the 2019 Sundance Film Festival, and was released in a limited theatrical release on November 22, 2019, followed by digital streaming on December 6, 2019, by Apple TV+. The film received generally positive reviews. It is based on a previous short film by Baig made in 2016 by the same name.

Plot
Hala Masood is a seventeen year old Pakistani American Muslim girl struggling with the clash of her family's values versus her desires. Her mom worries about Hala being near boys and skateboarding, while she has a secret crush on a boy in her school named Jesse, who's a non-Muslim (it's expected Hala will have her marriage arranged with a Muslim man). Things gradually come to a head as Hala is drawn toward Jesse, against her family's wishes. In the meantime, she learns her parents' marriage has problems she never knew of before.

Cast
 Geraldine Viswanathan as Hala Masood
 Jack Kilmer as Jesse 
 Purbi Joshi as Eram Masood
 Azad Khan as Zahid Masood
 Gabriel Luna as Mr. Lawrence
 Anna Chlumsky as Shannon Taylor
 Taylor Blim as Melanie

Production
In November 2017, Geraldine Viswanathan, Jack Kilmer, Anna Chlumsky, Gabriel Luna, Purbi Joshi and Azad Khan joined the cast of the film, with Minhal Baig directing from a screenplay she wrote.

Release
It had its world premiere at the Sundance Film Festival on January 26, 2019. Shortly after, Apple TV+ acquired distribution rights to the film. It was released in a limited theatrical release on November 22, 2019, followed by digital streaming on December 6, 2019.

Reception
Hala received positive reviews from film critics. The critics consensus reads, "Supported by a powerful central performance by Geraldine Viswanathan, Hala offers an insightful look at a young woman's journey of self-discovery." On Metacritic, the film holds a rating of 75 out of 100, based on 11 critics, indicating "generally favorable reviews".

In a positive review for The AV Club, Saloni Gajjar praised the film for shining "a new light on the tropes of teenage self-discovery". Writing for Variety, Amy Nicholson praised Baig's "naturalistic touch" and Viswanathan's performance, saying it proved "her range and, hopefully, longevity". Criticism was directed at the second half of the film, with Beandra July, writing for The Hollywood Reporter, criticizing the film's "choppy, incoherent finish".

References

External links
 – official site

2019 films
2010s coming-of-age drama films
2019 drama films
2010s high school films
American coming-of-age drama films
2010s teen drama films
American high school films
American teen drama films
2019 independent films
Apple TV+ original films
Overbrook Entertainment films
Skateboarding films
Asian-American drama films
2010s English-language films
2010s American films